KYBG (102.1 FM) is a classic hits formatted radio station owned by Third Partner Broadcasting and serving the Lafayette and Lake Charles areas.  Its studios are in Crowley and its transmitter is located northwest of Kaplan in Acadia Parish.

History
102.1 signed on in 1989 as Acadia Parish-focused KBAZ with a country format. In 1994, 102.1 changed calls to KSIG-FM and became a simulcast of Adult Standards sister station 1450/KSIG, which lasted until April 10, 1997 when the signal was upgraded to 50 kW and entered the Lafayette market. Upon the upgrade, the station took on the KQIS call letters and switched to adult contemporary as "Kiss 102."

Since the initial upgrade into the Lafayette market, KQIS has shifted its format several times. In 1998, KQIS had to drop the "KISS" branding (due to copyright infringement and a threatened lawsuit by Clear Channel). The station was not sued and had to be renamed as Soft Rock 102.1, whilst sticking to the same Adult contemporary format. Later that year, 102.1 was upgraded once more to 100 kW, extending coverage west to Lake Charles market and became a hybrid Adult Contemporary-Smooth Jazz "102.1 Kiss FM.", which further popularized the station. In October 2000, KQIS became one of the first stations in the United States to launch an 80s Oldies format, which lasted until late 2001, when newer music was mixed in to shift the station's format to Hot AC.

In 2002, the Kiss brand was dropped once and for all when what is now KOBW became Kiss FM. KOBW provides fringe coverage into the Lafayette area, and KQIS' owners feared a cease and desist from Clear Channel, who owns KOBW. The Hot AC format was tweaked to Top 40 for a short time in 2004 before settling on the current format.

On March 11, 2010 KQIS changed their call letters to KYBG. It now calls itself "BIG 102.1" and plays what it calls "the biggest hits" from the '70s and '80s with some from the 60s and early 90s also mixed in.

Previous logos

External links

Classic hits radio stations in the United States
YGB
Radio stations established in 1989
1989 establishments in Louisiana